Lunella correensis is a species of sea snail, a marine gastropod mollusk, in the subfamily Turbininae of the family Turbinidae, the turban snails.

Description
The size of the shell varies between 12 mm and 27 mm. The shell is similar to Lunella granulata, but is imperforate.

Distribution
This marine species occurs in the Northwest Pacific, especially off Korea and Japan.

References

External links
 Récluz, C. A. (1853). Description de coquilles nouvelles (Genres Turbo, Triton et Mitra). Journal de Conchyliologie. 4: 49-54
 

Turbinidae